Frangs Karanja is a paralympic athlete from Kenya competing mainly in category T11 distance running events.

Frangs competed in both the 1500m and 5000m at the 2004 Summer Paralympics where he won a bronze medal in the longer event.

References

Paralympic athletes of Kenya
Athletes (track and field) at the 2004 Summer Paralympics
Paralympic bronze medalists for Kenya
Living people
Medalists at the 2004 Summer Paralympics
Year of birth missing (living people)
Paralympic medalists in athletics (track and field)
Kenyan male middle-distance runners